Mollie Maxine Lindén, (born 6 March 1996) is a Swedish singer, mostly known as Idol 2014 participant. Lindén also auditioned for X Factor in 2012 which was broadcast on TV4 and made it to the bootcamp round before being eliminated. During 2014 she auditioned for Idol also broadcast on TV4, where she made it to the Top 11 and later to the final at Globen Arena. During her time at Idol she also released the music single "Losing Myself Without You" which was specially written for her during the series.

On 5 December 2014, Lindén was placed second in the Idol 2014 finale against the eventual winner Lisa Ajax.

In 2011, when Lindén was fifteen years old she participated in the television show "Kvällen är din" hosted by Martin Stenmarck. There she sang a duet with James Blunt.

In 2017, she changed her artist name from Mollie Lindén to Mollie Minot.

Discography

Singles

References

Living people
Idol (Swedish TV series) participants
1996 births
People from Oskarshamn Municipality
Swedish pop singers
21st-century Swedish singers